The Institut du Bosphore is a think-tank of high-level Turkish and French personalities from various backgrounds including politicians, businessmen, economists, experts and intellectuals. The stated mission of the Institut du Bosphore is to bolster free and objective links between France and Turkey.

The Institut du Bosphore debates topics such as global politics, economy, social and cultural issues with a view to highlighting Turkey's involvement in global society and in particular its close ties with the European Union and France. It facilitates common reflection of French and Turkish people on Europe and current global issues.

Bahadır Kaleağası is the President of the Institut du Bosphore.

References

External links
 English language official website

Think tanks based in France